Valiyeh (also Romanized as V‘alīyeh; also known as Loveylīyeh and Luailīyeh) is a village in Kut-e Abdollah Rural District, in the Central District of Karun County, Khuzestan Province, Iran. At the 2006 census, its population was 846, in 147 families.

References 

Populated places in Karun County